The 2009–10 Mountain West Conference men's basketball season marks the 11th season of Mountain West Conference basketball.

Preseason 
The Mountain West Conference held its pre-season media day on October 6, 2009 at The Mtn. studios in Denver, Colorado.  The league's media overwhelmingly voted Brigham Young the preseason #1 and BYU junior guard Jimmer Fredette the preseason player of the year.

New Mexico's Roman Martinez was named to the 30-man Lowe's Senior CLASS Award preseason candidate list.

Mountain West Media Poll

Preseason awards 
Preseason All-MWC team
Jimmer Fredette, BYU
Jonathan Tavernari, BYU
Billy White, San Diego State
Zvonko Buljan, TCU
Tre'Von Willis, UNLV

Preseason Player of the Year 
Jimmer Fredette, BYU

Preseason Newcomer of the Year
Derrick Jasper, UNLV

Preseason Freshman of the Year
Kawhi Leonard, San Diego State

Regular season

Season summary & highlights 
 TCU reached the quarterfinals of the NIT Season Tip-Off, losing to Arizona State, 52–49.
 Utah was the runner up in the Las Vegas Invitational, losing to Oklahoma State, 77–55.
 UNLV was the runner up in the inaugural Diamond Head Classic, losing to Southern California, 67–56.
 New Mexico ranks 17th in the Nation for Basketball Attendance. The Lobos averaged a crowd of 13,994. New Mexico was first in the Mountain West with UNLV in second.

Mountain West – Missouri Valley Challenge 
2009 marks the inaugural year of the Mountain West - Missouri Valley Challenge – matching teams from the Mountain West against teams from the Missouri Valley Conference in an effort to bolster strength of schedule for both leagues.  Match-ups were set in January, 2009 and were based on 2008–09 preseason projections.  The MVC won the first Challenge 5–4 as Northern Iowa knocked off Wyoming in the final game.

Results 
 November 13: BYU defeated Bradley, 70–60
 November 20: Colorado State lost to Indiana State, 65–60
 November 21: UNLV defeated Southern Illinois, 78–69
 December 5:  Air Force lost to Missouri State, 58–48
 December 12: TCU lost to Wichita State, 80–68
 December 19: New Mexico defeated Creighton, 66–61
 December 19: Utah lost to Illinois State, 73–63
 December 22: San Diego State defeated Drake, 76–73 (OT)
 December 23: Wyoming lost to Northern Iowa, 72–54

Rankings

Conference awards & honors

Weekly awards
MWC Player of the Week
Throughout the conference season, the MWC offices name a player of the week.

References

External links
2009–10 MWC Men's Basketball Prospectus
2009–10 MWC Men's Basketball Media Guide